James Knight-Pacheco  is a television personality who has appeared in cooking shows on the BBC. Knight-Pacheco and Alasdair Hooper were the runners-up in Raymond Blanc's BBC Two programme The Restaurant. Blanc offered them both a job at Le Manoir aux Quat' Saisons. In 2010, Knight-Pacheco and  Hooper hosted a BBC Two series on event catering Out of the Frying Pan.

Knight-Pacheco is the executive chef at ME by Melia, Dubai.

References

Venezuelan chefs
The Restaurant (British TV series)
British chefs
British food writers
British television chefs
Living people
Date of birth missing (living people)
Year of birth missing (living people)
Venezuelan television chefs